"Catch Your Wave" is a song by American power pop band the Click Five. It was released on November 22, 2005 as the second single from their debut studio album Greetings from Imrie House.

Track listing
"Catch Your Wave" [Album Version] – 2:52
"Voices Carry" [Main Version] – 3:53

Charts

References

External links
The Click Five official website

2005 singles
2005 songs
The Click Five songs
Lava Records singles
Songs written by Ben Romans